Esther de Berdt Reed (October 22, 1746 – September 18, 1780) was active in the American Revolutionary War as a civic leader for soldiers' relief, who formed and led the Ladies Association of Philadelphia to provide aid for George Washington's troops during the war.

Early life
Esther de Berdt was born in London, England on October 22, 1746, into a family descended of Protestant refugees from Ypres, who had fled the "Spanish Fury" led by the Duke of Alba. Her family (including her younger brother) called her Hette or Hettie and she loved books very much.  At the age of twenty-three, Esther married Joseph Reed, an American who had studied law in London.  Thereafter, she and her widowed mother followed him to Philadelphia in the American colonies. Joseph Reed became a prosperous lawyer and a local political leader, and the couple entertained members of the Continental Congress, including George Washington and John Adams. Joseph Reed later served as Washington's secretary and aide-de-camp.

Later life 
Though she was English by birth, Reed was exceptionally devoted to the revolutionary cause. During the Revolutionary War, she helped organize the Ladies Association of Philadelphia which raised more than $300,000 in support of the war. At the suggestion of General Washington, the group then used the funds to purchase linen and sew clothing for American troops. Reed had wanted to give the men gold or silver coins, something above and beyond what they would normally receive, but Washington feared the money would be used for liquor. He also had each volunteer seamstress, whether married or unmarried, sew her name into the clothing she made.  More than 2,200 shirts for the soldiers were created from the funds and the labor of these women.  For Reed's efforts in support of the American cause, she was recognized as a Daughter of Liberty.

Unfortunately, Reed did not live to see her efforts fully realized. She died on September 18, 1780, at the young age of 34. Sarah Franklin Bache, daughter of Benjamin Franklin, took over Reed's position and finished the patriotic project.  Though she did not see the project finished, Reed's efforts did not go unacknowledged.  She was recognized as a Daughter of Liberty, and women in several colonies, including Maryland, New Jersey, and Virginia, followed her example by starting similar fundraising organizations.  Her commitment to the Revolution is especially noteworthy because she was British; she had lived in America only a few years before the war against her homeland began. In writing about her reasons for this unusual action, Esther Reed made it clear that freedom was her motivation, and that women also were capable of publishing political thought.

During an evacuation of Philadelphia, she fled with her six children to Flemington, New Jersey.  She was initially buried in the Arch Street Presbyterian Church cemetery in Philadelphia but presently resides in Laurel Hill Cemetery.  Her epitaph reads:

Tips/Advice
Reed contributed to "The Sentiments of an American Woman," a broadside published in Philadelphia on 10 January 1780, which appealed for women's war support and declared that women were the equals of men in patriotism. The call to action was successful and the Ladies Association of Philadelphia became the largest women's organization of the Revolutionary War.

Research Places

Book reading
Roberts, Cokie. Founding Mothers (2004: New York:Harper Collins, p. 118-130)

Useful links

Biographic sketch of Esther de Berdt at White House website for children

1746 births
1780 deaths
 Women in the American Revolution
 People of colonial Pennsylvania
 People of Pennsylvania in the American Revolution
 First Ladies and Gentlemen of Pennsylvania
 Huguenot participants in the American Revolution
 People from London
18th-century Protestants
 American people of Belgian descent
 Reed family (Pennsylvania and New Jersey)
 English people of Belgian descent
 British emigrants to the Thirteen Colonies